Lake Hood Seaplane Base  is a state-owned seaplane base located three nautical miles (6 km) southwest of the central business district of Anchorage in the U.S. state of Alaska. The Lake Hood Strip  is a gravel runway located adjacent to the seaplane base.

Operating continuously and open to the public, Lake Hood is the world's busiest seaplane base, handling an average of 190 flights per day. It is located on Lakes Hood and Spenard (Niłkidal'iy in the indigenous Dena'ina language), next to Ted Stevens Anchorage International Airport three miles from downtown Anchorage.  The base has an operating control tower, and during the winter months the frozen lake surface is maintained for ski-equipped airplanes.

Most U.S. airports use the same three-letter location identifier for the FAA and IATA, Lake Hood is assigned LHD by the FAA but has no designation from the IATA. The airport's ICAO identifier is PALH.

Facilities and aircraft

Lake Hood Seaplane Base has three seaplane landing areas: E/W is 4,540 by 188 feet (1,384 x 57 m); N/S is 1,930 by 200 feet (588 x 61 m); NW/SE is 1,370 by 150 feet (418 x 46 m).

Lake Hood Strip has one runway designated 14/32 with a gravel surface measuring 2,200 by 75 feet (671 x 23 m).

For 12-month period ending August 1, 2005, the seaplane base had 69,400 aircraft operations, an average of 190 per day: 88% general aviation, 12% air taxi and <1% military. There are 781 aircraft based at this seaplane base: 97% single engine and 3% multi-engine.

References

External links
 Alaska Airmen's Association webcam on Lake Hood
 FAA Alaska airport diagram (GIF)

Airports in Anchorage, Alaska
Seaplane bases in Alaska